Francisco Escalante Molina (born 29 January 1965) is a Venezuelan archbishop and diplomat of the Holy See. He has been the Apostolic Nuncio to Haiti since June 2021.

Biography 
Born in La Grita, Venezuela, on 29 January 1965, Molina was ordained a priest on 26 August 1989. He joined the diplomatic service of the Holy See on 13 June 1998. His early assignments included stints in Sudan, Ghana, Malta, Nicaragua, Japan and Slovenia.

On 19 March 2016, he was appointed an archbishop and named apostolic nuncio to the Republic of the Republic of the Congo. He was given additional responsibilities as apostolic nuncio to Gabon on 21 May.

On 4 June 2021, Pope Francis named him Apostolic Nuncio to Haiti.

See also
 List of heads of the diplomatic missions of the Holy See

References 

1965 births
Apostolic Nuncios to Gabon
Apostolic Nuncios to the Republic of the Congo
Apostolic Nuncios to Haiti
Living people
21st-century Roman Catholic titular archbishops
Venezuelan Roman Catholic archbishops